IEEE Transactions on Plasma Science is a peer-reviewed scientific journal published monthly by the IEEE Nuclear and Plasma Sciences Society. The journal covers plasma science and engineering, including but not limited to magnetohydrodynamics, thermionics, space plasma and plasma-wave interactions. Its current editor-in-chief is Steven J. Gitomer, Senior Research Scientist at Los Alamos National Laboratory.

The journal was established in 1973. According to the Journal Citation Reports, it has a 2020 impact factor of 1.222. In between 2000 and 2004, it was ranked as number 10 for the impact factor in "Physics - Fluids & Plasmas" by Thomson.

References

External links
 

Plasma Science, IEEE Transactions on
English-language journals
Publications established in 1973
Monthly journals
Plasma science journals